Vappu Salonen (12 February 1929 – 9 July 2017) was a Finnish gymnast. She competed in seven events at the 1952 Summer Olympics.

References

1929 births
2017 deaths
Finnish female artistic gymnasts
Olympic gymnasts of Finland
Gymnasts at the 1952 Summer Olympics
Gymnasts from Tampere